Mustafa Mohammed Maan (born 15 January 1997) is an Iraqi footballer who plays as a defender for Al-Shorta in the Iraqi Premier League.

International career
On 29 March 2021, Maan made his first international cap with Iraq against Uzbekistan in a friendly match in Tashkent that ended with an Iraqi victory 1–0 over the host team.

Honours

Club
Al-Zawraa
 Iraqi Premier League: 2015–16

Al-Quwa Al-Jawiya
 Iraqi Premier League: 2020–21
 Iraq FA Cup: 2020–21
 AFC Cup: 2018

Al-Shorta
 Iraqi Premier League: 2021–22
 Iraqi Super Cup: 2022

References

External links 
 
 

1997 births
Living people
Iraqi footballers
Iraq international footballers
Al-Shorta SC players
Al-Quwa Al-Jawiya players
Association football defenders